Zhu Xiangyun (born 1950) also known as Chu Hsiang-Yun is a former international table tennis player from China.

Table tennis career
She won three medals in the World Table Tennis Championships.

During the 1975 World Table Tennis Championships she won a silver medal in the doubles with Lin Meiqun.

Two years later she won a second silver in the doubles with Wei Lijie and then won a gold medal for China in the Corbillon Cup (women's team event) with Ge Xin'ai, Zhang Deying and Zhang Li.

See also
 List of table tennis players
 List of World Table Tennis Championships medalists

References

Living people
1950 births
People from Benxi
Table tennis players from Liaoning
Chinese female table tennis players
World Table Tennis Championships medalists